There are at least 18 named lakes and reservoirs in Big Horn County, Montana.

Lakes
 Arapooish Pond, el. 
 Crater Lake (Big Horn County, Montana), el. 
 Little Hawk Lake, el. 
 Muddy Lake, el.

Reservoirs
 Bighorn Reservoirs, el. 
 Brown Reservoir, el. 
 Chalk Butte Reservoir, el. 
 Halfway Reservoir, el. 
 Liming Reservoir, el. 
 Lodge Grass Reservoir, el. 
 Lodge Grass Storage Reservoir, el. 
 Lower Indian Creek Reservoir, el. 
 Rednose Reservoir, el. 
 Steinhilber Reservoir, el. 
 Tongue River Reservoir, el. 
 Two Moon Reservoir, el. 
 Upper Indian Creek Reservoir, el. 
 Yellowtail Afterbay Reservoir, el.

See also
 List of lakes in Montana

Notes

Bodies of water of Big Horn County, Montana
Big Horn